Chunky Shrapnel is a 2020 concert film and live album by Australian psychedelic rock band King Gizzard & the Lizard Wizard.

The concert film was first announced by the band on social media on 6 March 2020 and was set to be screened at the Astor Theatre, Melbourne on 3 and 4 April. However, because of the COVID-19 pandemic, the original screenings were cancelled. Instead, the film was digitally premiered on Vimeo on-demand for 24 hours on 17 April 2020, and again on 24 April 2020 (due to popular demand) and was then later given a theatrical premier at the Astor Theatre, Melbourne on 8 May 2021. The live double album of the same name was released alongside the film's second screening.

The film follows the band on their 2019 tour of Europe and the UK in support of the album Infest the Rats' Nest and was described as "literally bringing the audience onto the stage" and a "uniquely immersive experience never before captured on film. A musical road movie dipped in turpentine." The film was shot and directed by John Angus Stewart and also features an "eerie" score by band frontman Stu Mackenzie.

Soundtrack live album 

A live double album was released in tandem with the second Vimeo premiere of the film on 24 April 2020. It is the fourth live album by the band.

The album features all full song performances from the film, along with sections of frontman Stu Mackenzie's score for the film in the form of the tracks "Anamnesis" and "Quarantine" and transitions between live songs.

Track listing 
Vinyl releases have tracks 1–4 on Side A, tracks 5–10 on Side B, tracks 11-15 on Side C and track 16 on Side D.

Charts

References

2020 live albums
2020 films
King Gizzard & the Lizard Wizard live albums
Concert films